Suixi railway station is a railway station in Suixi County, Huaibei, Anhui, China. The station is an intermediate stop on the Fuliji–Jiahezhai railway.

History
Passenger services at this station and nearby Fuliji railway station were suspended on 1 April 2006. The station continues to handle freight.

References

Railway stations in Anhui